František Konvička (born August 11, 1938 in Okříšky, Czechoslovakia) is a former Czech professional basketball player and coach. At 6'3 " tall (1.92 m), he played at the small forward position.

Playing career

Club career
Konvička spent his club career playing with Spartak Brno. He reached two EuroLeague Finals, in 1964, and 1968, averaging 26.6 points per game.

National team career
Konvička represented the senior Czechoslovakian national basketball team for a decade, in international competitions. He won two EuroBasket silver medals, in 1959 and 1967, as well as a bronze medal in 1969.

Coaching career
After his playing career, Konvička worked as a basketball coach.

See also
Czechoslovakian national basketball team
List of the best czech basketball players of the 20th century - František Konvička (5th)
Czechoslovak Basketball League career stats leaders
Basketball at the 1960 Summer Olympics
FIBA All-Star Games

External links
FIBA Profile

1938 births
Living people
Basketball players at the 1960 Summer Olympics
Czech basketball coaches
Czechoslovak basketball coaches
Czech men's basketball players
Czechoslovak men's basketball players
Olympic basketball players of Czechoslovakia
Small forwards
People from Třebíč District
Sportspeople from the Vysočina Region